Crossroads Correctional Center (CRCC) is a Missouri Department of Corrections state prison for men located in Cameron, DeKalb County, Missouri, United States. (The town of Cameron straddles DeKalb and Clinton Counties.)  According to the official Official Manual State of Missouri the facility has a capacity of 1,440 maximum security prisoners.

The facility opened in 1997 and is immediately adjacent to the Western Missouri Correctional Center, which opened in 1988. Crossroads was the first Missouri prison to install a perimeter electric fence with a lethal charge.

Among the inmates of Crossroads are the kidnapper Michael J. Devlin from Kirkwood, Missouri, serving 74 life sentences, and the serial killer Lorenzo Gilyard.

In January 2019, Missouri Governor Mike Parsons announced that Crossroads Correctional Center would be closing. In July 2019 many of the offenders were transferred to one side of  Western Missouri Correctional Center which is adjacent to CRCC, and others where transferred to prisons throughout the state.

References

Prisons in Missouri
Buildings and structures in DeKalb County, Missouri
1997 establishments in Missouri